Agonidium kikuyu is a species of ground beetle in the subfamily Platyninae. It was described by Burgeon in 1935.

References

kikuyu
Beetles described in 1935